Shahvali or Shah Vali may refer to:
Shah Vali, Kaleybar, East Azerbaijan Province
Shah Vali, Khoda Afarin, East Azerbaijan Province
Shah Vali, Bahmai, Kohgiluyeh and Boyer-Ahmad Province
Shah Vali, Bahmai-ye Garmsiri, Bahmai County, Kohgiluyeh and Boyer-Ahmad Province
Shah Vali, Kohgiluyeh, Kohgiluyeh and Boyer-Ahmad Province
Shah Vali, Kermanshah
Shah Vali, Masjed Soleyman, Khuzestan Province
Shah Vali, Shadegan, Khuzestan Province
Shah Vali, Kurdistan
Shahvali, Lorestan
Shah Vali, Lorestan